Nunimeus is a genus of moths belonging to the family Tortricidae.

Species
Nunimeus numenius Razowski & Becker, 2001

See also
List of Tortricidae genera

References

  2001: Polskie Pismo Ent. 70: 103

External links
tortricidae.com

Euliini
Tortricidae genera